Handsworth, West Midlands, in the United Kingdom, has experienced a number of riots in the last few decades. 

Handsworth Riots may refer to:

 1981 Handsworth riots
 1985 Handsworth riots
 1991 Handsworth riots
 2005 Birmingham riots
 2011 England riots (which affected Handsworth and other parts of Birmingham)